Leonard Thompson (17 July 1908 – 20 April 1935) is the first person to have received an injection of insulin as a treatment for Type 1 diabetes.

Biography
Thompson was first treated at SickKids hospital before being transferred to the care of physicians Andrew Almon Fletcher, Duncan Archibald Graham, and Walter Ruggles Campbell. Thompson received his first injection in Toronto, Ontario, on 11 January 1922, at 13 years of age. The first injection had an apparent impurity which was the likely cause for the allergic reaction he displayed. After a refined process was developed by James Collip to improve the canine pancreas extract, the second dosage was successfully delivered to the young patient 12 days after the first.

Thompson showed signs of improved health and went on to live 13 more years taking doses of insulin, before dying of pneumonia at age 26.

Until insulin was made clinically available, a diagnosis of Type 1 diabetes was a death sentence, more or less quickly (usually within months, and frequently within weeks or days).

See also 
 Gladys Boyd, paediatrician, pioneer in the treatment of juvenile diabetes.
 Charles Best, co-discoverer of insulin.
 Elizabeth Hughes Gossett, a notable early recipient of insulin.
 Frederick Banting, co-discoverer of insulin.
 Islets of Langerhans
 Pancreas
 James D. Havens, first American to receive insulin from Toronto.

References

External links
 

1908 births
1935 deaths
People with type 1 diabetes
Deaths from pneumonia in Ontario